SID Municipal  is a Salvadoran professional football club based in Santa Isabel Ishuatán,  El Salvador.

The club currently plays in the Tercera Division de Fútbol Salvadoreño. 

The club was founded in 1965.

References

SID Municipal